Londonderry Port and Harbour Commissioners (LPHC) No. 3 R H Smyth is a preserved Irish steam locomotive.

Built by Avonside Engineering Company of Bristol, England works No. 2021 in 1928.  A fairly typical  built to the  Irish broad gauge, it led a rather uneventful life shunting the dual gauge (5 ft 3 in and 3 ft) docks in Derry on the west bank of the River Foyle in Northern Ireland.  It was equipped with a single off-centre buffer and coupling at each end for shunting  gauge stock, in addition to conventional buffers and drawhooks for 5 ft 3 in gauge.  After withdrawal, it was bought privately in 1968 before being sold for £1 to the Railway Preservation Society of Ireland at Whitehead in 1972.  The engine then acquired the nickname 'Harvey' in honour of showjumper Harvey Smith.

In 2000, 30 years after the end of mainline steam in Northern Ireland, No. 3 achieved something of a celebrity status when it was hired by Henry Boot Ltd to help engineering work on the relaying of the Bleach Green Junction - Antrim railway line.  This was followed in 2005 by another contract assisting the relaying of the Carrickfergus - Whitehead railway line.

During 2006, the locomotive was placed on loan to the Downpatrick & County Down Railway In 2013 it was returned to Whitehead where it awaits Overhaul.

References

External links 
 LONDONDERRY PORT & HARBOUR COMMISSIONERS 0-6-0ST No.3 "R.H. Smyth"

0-6-0ST locomotives
Individual locomotives of Ireland
Steam locomotives of Ireland
Steam locomotives of Northern Ireland
Avonside locomotives
Railway locomotives introduced in 1928
5 ft 3 in gauge locomotives